Minsk na Ladonyah is a Russian language newspaper published in Belarus.

Russian-language newspapers published in Belarus